Luigi Natoli (15 June 1799 – 24 February 1875) was a Sicilian Roman Catholic priest. He was born in Patti, in north-eastern Sicily. He was ordained on 2 March 1822; was appointed bishop of the Caltagirone on 15 March 1858; and became archbishop of Messina on 22 February 1867. He died on 24 February 1875.

References

Further reading 
 Scritti vari di Monsignor Natoli, Tip. Del Progresso, Messina 1877.
 F. Pisciotta, Natoli Luigi, in F. Armetta (ed.), Dizionario Enciclopedico dei Pensatori e Teologi di Sicilia. Secc. XIX-XX, Palermo 2010.

1799 births
1875 deaths
19th-century Italian Roman Catholic archbishops
19th-century Italian Roman Catholic bishops
Religious leaders from the Province of Messina